A Morte Comanda o Cangaço is a 1960 Brazilian Western action film directed by Carlos Coimbra and Walter Guimarães Motta. Shot in Pernambuco, it stars Alberto Ruschel, Aurora Duarte, and Milton Ribeiro in a fiction about cangaço. It was entered into the 11th Berlin International Film Festival. The film was also selected as the Brazilian entry for the Best Foreign Language Film at the 33rd Academy Awards, but was not accepted as a nominee.

Cast
 Alberto Ruschel as Raimundo Vieira
 Aurora Duarte as Florind
 Milton Ribeiro as Capitano Silvero
 Maria Augusta Costa Leite as Dona Cidinha
 Gilberto Marques as Coll. Nesinho
 Ruth de Souza
 Lyris Castellani
 Apolo Monteiro
 Edson França
 José Mercaldi
 Leo de Avelar
 Jean Lafront

See also
 List of submissions to the 33rd Academy Awards for Best Foreign Language Film
 List of Brazilian submissions for the Academy Award for Best Foreign Language Film

References

External links

1960 films
1960 Western (genre) films
1960s Portuguese-language films
Brazilian Western (genre) films
Docudrama films
Films directed by Carlos Coimbra
Films set in 1929
Films shot in Pernambuco
Films about outlaws
Films about cangaço